Qilin Li is a Chinese environmental engineer who is a professor of Civil and Environmental Engineering at Rice University. She develops new technologies to analyze and treat contaminated water. Li is a Fellow of the International Water Association.

Early life and education 
Li is from China. She earned her undergraduate degree at Tsinghua University. She moved to the United States for her graduate studies, joining the University of Illinois at Urbana–Champaign as a doctoral student. She worked on membrane filtration systems with Vernon Snoeyink. After completing her PhD Li moved to Yale University, where she worked as a postdoctoral fellow.

Research and career 
Li studies water contamination and treatment. She joined the faculty at Rice University in 2006. The research of the Li laboratory for Advanced Water Treatment Technologies includes analysis of how membranes become fouled during filtration, how to remove salt from seawater and how to use nanotechnology to clean water.

She is the Associate Director of the Center for Nanotechnology Enabled Water Treatment (NEWT). Here she was awarded a $1.7 million United States Department of Energy grant to develop new technologies that make use of sunlight and nanoparticles to treat water. Li created the Nanophotonics Enabled Solar Membrane Distillation (NESMD), which combines a traditional porous membrane with low-cost light-capturing nanoparticles. Membrane distillation is cheap and can be operated in low temperature, low pressure environments. In NESMD, highly localized solar illumination and photothermal heating drives the process of membrane distillation.  She was elected Fellow of the International Water Association in 2018. At the 2019 American Water Summit Li and her NESMD devices were awarded first place in the Tech Idol competition.

In 2019 Li was awarded one of Rice University's InterDisciplinary Excellence Awards, using which she combined resource management and efforts to encourage more sustainable resource consumption on the Rice campus. Li serves as Co-Chair of the International Water Association Nano & Water Specialty Group.

Selected publications

References

External links 
 

Living people
Tsinghua University alumni
Grainger College of Engineering alumni
Rice University faculty
Water treatment
Year of birth missing (living people)